André Zimmermann (20 February 1939 – 5 November 2019) was a French cyclist.

He was the first French rider to win the Tour de l'Avenir. He competed in the Tour de France fives times from 1964 to 1969.

He was on Jacques Anquetil's team when he won his fifth Tour de France in 1964.

Major results
1963
1st Overall Tour de l'Avenir
1st Stages 3 & 9
1st Stage 6 Route de France
1966
1st Grand Prix d'Aix-en-Provence
1967
3rd Bordeaux-Saintes
1968
3rd GP Ouest-France

Results at the Grand Tours

Tour de France
1964: 36th
1965: 17th
1966: 23rd
1967: DNF
1969: 26th

Giro d'Italia
1964: 12th
1968: DNF

Vuelta a España
1967: 29th

References

1939 births
2019 deaths
French male cyclists